Shotgun Stories is a 2007 drama film about a feud between two sets of half-brothers following the death of their father in rural Arkansas. The film was written and directed by Jeff Nichols, and stars Michael Shannon, Barlow Jacobs, Michael Abbott Jr. and Glenda Pannell.

Plot summary
Son Hayes wakes up and gets dressed, revealing that he has scars from a shotgun blast on his back. He meets his younger brothers, Boy and Kid, who live in a van and a tent respectively, saying that his wife Annie has left him over his gambling habit and inviting them to live in his house. Son and Kid earn meager livings at a fish farm, where workers take bets on how Son received his scars; Boy is an unsuccessful basketball coach at the local middle school. One night, while Son is researching his gambling system, the boys' estranged mother arrives to announce that their estranged father (from whom she has long been divorced) has just died.

The brothers crash the funeral, where their father's second family is mourning. Son delivers a scathing commentary on their father, especially for callously abandoning them to be raised by their hateful mother, while going off to lovingly raise a second set of sons meanwhile forgetting, for the most part, his first set of sons.  In the process, Son nearly starts a brawl with his four half-brothers. The eldest half-brother, Mark, vows revenge and starts a chain of violent confrontations. Meanwhile, Annie returns and tries to salvage her relationship with Son, but Son is unwilling to give up gambling. Kid plans on marrying his girlfriend, Cheryl, should he get an expected raise, but worries about providing for her and staying faithful. After Mark kills Boy's dog by leaving a poisonous snake in its water bowl, Kid attacks and kills Mark, but is himself severely injured in the fight and dies in the hospital. Son and Boy are unaware that Mark's brothers Stephen and John were involved in the fight until after Kid's funeral, when an acquaintance named Shampoo tells them.  Son then goes to their mother, who is coldly indifferent to everything that is happening, to inform her that Kid has just died, while condemning her for raising her sons to be full of hate toward their half-brothers, before leaving her for the last time.

The confrontations between the remaining brothers escalate, with Son on one side and John and Stephen Hayes on the other side unwilling to let the matter rest, despite their brother Cleaman's attempts to stop the feud. Son and Boy invade their half-brothers' farm and attack Stephen, but are interrupted and hospitalized by the remaining family and other farm workers. Annie and Cheryl are left grieving and bewildered by the continued fighting. Boy purchases a shotgun and holds Cleaman at gunpoint, but hesitates after seeing the man's sons, and leaves. Boy expresses worry that Son will kill himself trying to protect him from the half-brothers. He recalls how Son received his scars while protecting him and Kid.

The second family arms themselves with shotguns on their farm, bracing for a shootout. Boy arrives at the farm unarmed and states that he is done fighting, offering a truce. The less combative half-brothers force Stephen to accept the truce, but he worries that Son will not hold to the agreement. Afterwards, Son awakens from his coma. Boy returns to Son, who recuperates from his injuries. The movie ends with the beginning of fall, with Cleaman seeing his youngest brother John off to college, Boy coaching again, and Son living at home with Annie and their son, Carter. The final scene of the movie shows Son and Boy enjoying a peaceful afternoon on the porch with Carter.

Cast
 Son Hayes – Michael Shannon
 Boy Hayes – Douglas Ligon
 Kid Hayes – Barlow Jacobs
 Nicole – Natalie Canerday
 Annie Hayes – Glenda Pannell
 Stephen Hayes – Lynnsee Provence
 Cleaman Hayes – Michael Abbott Jr.
 Mark Hayes – Travis Smith
 Shampoo Douglas – G. Alan Wilkins

Critical reception
Shotgun Stories has positive reviews, earning an 90% "Certified Fresh" rating at Rotten Tomatoes from 49 reviews, with an average rating of 7.3/10. The site's critical consensus reads: "Thanks to a talented cast and its uncommon depth, Nichols' debut manages to rise above its overly familiar plot."

It appeared on several critics' top ten lists of the best films of 2008. Bill White of the Seattle Post-Intelligencer named it the best film of 2008, Philip Martin of the Arkansas Democrat-Gazette named it the 3rd best film of 2008, David Edelstein of New York magazine named it the 8th best film of 2008, and Roger Ebert of Chicago Sun-Times named it one of the best films of the year.

References

External links
 
 

2007 films
2007 drama films
2007 directorial debut films
2007 independent films
American drama films
Films directed by Jeff Nichols
2000s English-language films
Films set in Arkansas
Vertigo Films films
Southern Gothic films
Films about brothers
2000s American films